Nepenthes mira (from Latin mirus "wonderful") is a highland pitcher plant endemic to Palawan in the Philippines. It grows at elevations of 1550–1605 m above sea level.

Nepenthes mira was formally described by Matthew Jebb and Martin Cheek in 1998. The authors suggest that N. mira is related to the Bornean species N. edwardsiana, N. macrophylla, and N. villosa. In his Carnivorous Plant Database, taxonomist Jan Schlauer treats this species as a heterotypic synonym of N. deaniana.

Nepenthes mira has no known natural hybrids. No forms or varieties have been described.

References

Further reading

 Amoroso, V.B., L.D. Obsioma, J.B. Arlalejo, R.A. Aspiras, D.P. Capili, J.J.A. Polizon & E.B. Sumile 2009. Inventory and conservation of endangered, endemic and economically important flora of Hamiguitan Range, southern Philippines. Blumea 54(1–3): 71–76.  
 Bauer, U., C.J. Clemente, T. Renner & W. Federle 2012. Form follows function: morphological diversification and alternative trapping strategies in carnivorous Nepenthes pitcher plants. Journal of Evolutionary Biology 25(1): 90–102. 
 Co, L. & W. Suarez 2012. Nepenthaceae. Co's Digital Flora of the Philippines.
 Fleischmann, A. & G. Heubl 2009. Overcoming DNA extraction problems from carnivorous plants. Anales del Jardín Botánico de Madrid 66(2): 209–215. 
 McPherson, S.R. & V.B. Amoroso 2011. Field Guide to the Pitcher Plants of the Philippines. Redfern Natural History Productions, Poole.
  McPherson, S. & T. Gronemeyer 2008. Die Nepenthesarten der Philippinen Eine Fotodokumentation. Das Taublatt 60(1): 34–78.
 McPherson, S., G. Bourke, J. Cervancia, M. Jaunzems, E. Gironella, A. Robinson & A. Fleischmann 2011. Nepenthes leonardoi (Nepenthaceae), a new pitcher plant species from Palawan, Philippines. Carniflora Australis 8(1): 4–19.
 McPherson, S.R. 2011. Comparison of the highland Palaweño Nepenthes. In: New Nepenthes: Volume One. Redfern Natural History Productions, Poole. pp. 364–381.
  Meimberg, H. 2002.  Ph.D. thesis, Ludwig Maximilian University of Munich, Munich.
 Meimberg, H. & G. Heubl 2006. Introduction of a nuclear marker for phylogenetic analysis of Nepenthaceae. Plant Biology 8(6): 831–840. 
 Meimberg, H., S. Thalhammer, A. Brachmann & G. Heubl 2006. Comparative analysis of a translocated copy of the trnK intron in carnivorous family Nepenthaceae. Molecular Phylogenetics and Evolution 39(2): 478–490. 

Carnivorous plants of Asia
mira
Endemic flora of the Philippines
Flora of Palawan
Plants described in 1998
Vulnerable flora of Asia
Taxa named by Matthew Jebb
Taxa named by Martin Cheek